Bob Dylan – The Rolling Thunder Revue: The 1975 Live Recordings is a box set of 1975 live recordings by Bob Dylan, released on June 7, 2019. For this tour, Dylan assembled a loose collective of a backing band called Guam and played across North America for several dozen shows. The tie-in Netflix documentary film Rolling Thunder Revue: A Bob Dylan Story by Martin Scorsese was released the following week. A similar compilation was released in 2002 entitled Bob Dylan Live 1975, The Rolling Thunder Revue, as part of Dylan's ongoing Bootleg Series.  That compilation was re-released on vinyl as a companion to the later release.

Critical reception
Editors of AllMusic gave the album four out of five stars, with Thom Jurek's review highlighting the quality of the packaging and recording as well as the diversity of the arrangement of songs from night to night, and the rarities, summing up, "it's immeasurably valuable for the way it illuminates a wildly spontaneous period in the songwriter's career". Rolling Stones David Fricke also gave the compilation four out of five stars, highlighting the track "Isis" and how it evolves through the performances to display Dylan's musical versatility and the chaos in his personal life.

The album was released on compact disc as well as a digital download. Discs refer to divisions in the physical release.

Personnel
All songs but the rarities Disc:
Bob Dylan – vocals, guitar, piano, harmonica

Guam
Ronee Blakley – vocals
T Bone Burnett – guitar, vocals
Ramblin’ Jack Elliott – vocals, guitar
Allen Ginsberg – vocals, finger cymbals
David Mansfield – steel guitar, mandolin, violin, dobro
Joni Mitchell – vocals
Bobby Neuwirth – guitar, vocals
Scarlet Rivera – violin
Luther Rix – drums, percussion, congas
Mick Ronson – guitar
Steven Soles – guitar, vocals
Rob Stoner – bass guitar, vocals
Howie Wyeth – drums, piano

Guest musicians
Joan Baez – vocals and guitar on "Tears of Rage", "I Shall Be Released", "Blowin' in the Wind", "Wild Mountain Thyme", "Mama, You Been on My Mind", "Dark as a Dungeon", "The Times They Are A-Changin'", "I Dreamed I Saw St. Augustine", "Never Let Me Go", "The Water Is Wide", and "This Land Is Your Land"
Roger McGuinn – guitar and vocals on "Knockin" on Heaven's Door" and "This Land Is Your Land"

Disc 14:
Bob Dylan – vocals, guitar, piano, harmonica with
Eric Andersen – guitars on "Simple Twist of Fate", member of Guam on "Isis", "The Tracks of My Tears", and "It Takes a Lot to Laugh, It Takes a Train to Cry"
Joan Baez – vocals on "Simple Twist of Fate"
Larry Keegan – vocals on "Your Cheatin' Heart"
Rob Stoner – bass guitar on "Simple Twist of Fate"
Robbie Robertson – guitar on "It Takes a Lot to Laugh, It Takes a Train to Cry"
Arlen Roth – guitars on "Simple Twist of Fate", member of Guam on "Isis", "The Tracks of My Tears", and "It Takes a Lot to Laugh, It Takes a Train to Cry"

Charts

References

Further reading
Shelter from the Storm: Bob Dylan's Rolling Thunder Yearbook, by Sid Griffin (Jawbone Press, London), 2010 
Rolling Thunder Logbook by Sam Shepard (The Viking Press, New York City), 1977 
On the Road with Bob Dylan by Larry "Ratso" Sloman (Three Rivers Press, New York City), 2002

External links
Announcement from Dylan's site
Streaming sampler of 10 tracks
Bob Dylan's Rolling Thunder Revue: The 1975 Live Recordings: Everything You Need to Know from Billboard

2019 live albums
Bob Dylan live albums
Columbia Records live albums
Legacy Recordings live albums